Euzophera perticella is a species of snout moth in the genus Euzophera.

Their larvae are a pest on Solanum melongena (Solanaceae).

Distribution
This species is known from India and Sri Lanka.

References

Gyan Swarup Arora, 2000. Studies on Some Indian Pyralid Species of Economic Importance, Part I Crambinae, Schoenobiinae, Nymphulinae, Phycitinae and Galleriinae (Lepidoptera: Pyralidae) 1st Edition. Zoological Survey of India.

Moths described in 1888
Phycitini
Moths of Asia